Toucan Sam is the cartoon toucan mascot for Froot Loops breakfast cereal. The character has been featured in advertising since 1963. He exhibits the ability to smell Froot Loops from great distances and invariably locates a concealed bowl of the cereal while intoning, "Follow your nose! It always knows!", sometimes followed by "The flavor of fruit! Wherever it grows!" Another version of this phrase in a string of commercials in the late-2000s presents the character at the end of the commercials saying "Just follow your nose!", followed by his nephews retorting, "For the fruity taste that shows!"

History
Toucan Sam became the mascot for Froot Loops cereal in 1963. The cartoon character was created by Manuel R. Vega and originally voiced by Mel Blanc, using an ordinary American accent. Blanc's original commercials were noted for their use of Pig Latin (referring to the cereal as OOT-fray OOPS-lay). The ad agency later decided to switch to the British accent more commonly associated with the character. They then employed Paul Frees to do what is, in effect, an imitation of Ronald Colman. After the death of Paul Frees, Toucan Sam's voice was performed by Maurice LaMarche (1986–2021), then Matthew Curtis for a single spot in 2020. In July 2021, Toucan Sam was re-designed and re-cast as a friendly and wise British accented voice - a role filled by voice actor Colin Cassidy. Toucan Sam had a cousin named Arty Artin that was featured in a few commercials. Animation of the commercials were created by several animation companies including Thumbnail Spots; this impacted the character growth among the years.

Although his nose originally had two pink stripes, during the 1970s it became a tradition that each stripe on his nose represented one of the colors of the pieces in the cereal. The additions of new colors have made this color scheme no longer accurate. There are now six colors of this cereal. The first new color was green, which was introduced in 1991, then purple in 1994, and blue in 1996.

The colors, perhaps, represent different flavors present in the cereal, but each color has the same flavor.

Maya Archaeology Initiative
The Maya Archaeology Initiative (MAI) is a project of the World Free Press Institute (WFPI). In June 2010, WFPI submitted a trademark application with the U.S. Patent and Trademark Office for the MAI logo, a profile of a toucan with a Mayan temple in the background, both encircled by yellow/green light. It was published on 15 March 2011.

Kellogg's (owner of the Toucan Sam logo) objected on the grounds that the two logos are too similar. That caused a long argument, which ended on 15 November 2011 with an announcement that Kellogg's and the MAI are forming a charitable partnership.

Recent commercials

Since 1994, Toucan Sam has been joined onscreen by his nephews Puey, Susey, and Louis, though they are never actually referred to by name. The nephews are voiced by two notable voiceover artists: Frank Welker and Jim Cummings. In recent commercials, Toucan Sam's three nephews have joined him in opposition to many practical Froot Loop-loving enemies through a series of integrated commercials (each of them as well appropriately advertise the cereal itself).

The Toucan Sam campaign was produced by Pepper Films, Inc. until 2013, when Kellogg's transitioned the Froot Loops brand to CGI with animation company Nathan Love. Toucan Sam is currently voiced by Colin Cassidy.

In 2020, Toucan Sam was redesigned to a more simplistic and contemporary design. The design received negative reactions, with many detractors noting that actual toucans don't have human-like mouths in real life. He was redesigned again in 2021, retaining his original look in a brighter blue with red, orange, green and purple stripes on his nose, while having a more solid appearance instead of a feathery texture. This was done due to the overwhelming negative reaction the previous redesign received. During this redesign, a Froot Loops YouTube channel was created.

See also
List of breakfast cereal advertising characters

References

Bird mascots
Cartoon mascots
Male characters in advertising
Anthropomorphic birds
Computer-animated television series
Mascots introduced in 1963
Kellogg's characters